This is a list of maize dishes, in which maize (corn) is used as a primary ingredient. Additionally, some foods and beverages that are prepared with maize are listed.

Ingredients
Corn can be processed into an intermediate form to be cooked further. These processes include drying, milling, and nixtamalization.

Foods

Soups, stews, and porridge
Corn, in the form of cornmeal or kernels of fresh sweet corn, can be boiled or stewed.
  
 
 
 
 
 
 
 
 
 
 
 
 
 
 
 
 
 
 
 
 
Ogi -  Fermented cereal pudding from Nigeria, typically made from maize, sorghum, or millet
 
 Patasca - Peruvian hominy and meat soup

Tamales and related
Tamales are a dish of nixtamalized maize that is ground, wrapped in a corn husk, and steamed. Tamales originated in Mesoamerica as early as 8000 to 5000 BC. There are many regional variants and related dishes.

Breads and cakes
Baked and steamed breads and cakes can be made using corn, often as a flour.
 
 
 
 
  

 
 
 
 
 
 
 
 
 
 
 
 
 
Corn cake / "Mălai dulce" - traditional Romanian corn cake, from Transylvania region

Tortilla dishes

Corn tortillas are used to prepare many other dishes.

Fried dishes
Assorted fried snacks and other fritters are made from corn or cornmeal.

Other
 
 
 
 
 
 
 
 
 Grontol - traditional meal from [Central Java] area of [Indonesia] made from boiled corn kernels that have been soaked overnight, and mixed with steamed grated coconut.

Beverages
Corn can be fermented into alcoholic drinks, infused as a tisane, or ground and used to thicken drinks.

See also

 List of edible seeds
 List of Mexican dishes
 List of sweetcorn varieties

References

 
Maize